John Alexander Fleck (born 24 August 1991) is a Scottish professional footballer who plays as a midfielder for  club Sheffield United.

He began his career with Rangers, making his senior debut in 2008 aged 16, being hyped in the media as a future star, and later spending a period on loan to Blackpool. In 2012 he transferred to Coventry City, remaining there until 2016 when he joined Sheffield United, helping the club achieve two promotions in three years, moving up from League One to the Premier League.

Early life
Fleck was born in Glasgow and was brought up in the city's Yoker district; he was educated at Knightswood Secondary School. His uncle, former Scotland international Robert Fleck, played for Rangers, Chelsea and Norwich in the 1980s and 1990s.

Club career

Rangers

Fleck began his career in the Rangers youth teams; he played in their 5–0 Scottish Youth Cup victory over Celtic on 26 April 2007. On 12 July 2007, Fleck was called up to take part in the full squad pre-season tour of Germany, and was handed his debut for the first team against SV Lippstadt 08 on 15 July 2007, becoming the first 15-year-old to play for the first team since Derek Ferguson in 1982. Fleck impressed and scored in a 3–1 friendly victory over Sportfreunde Lotte in the next friendly game.

On 25 August 2007, just a day after his 16th birthday, Fleck was included for the first time in the Rangers first team squad for a competitive match against Kilmarnock. He made his competitive debut on 23 January 2008 in the Scottish Cup game against East Stirlingshire and made his league debut on 22 May in the final league game of the season against Aberdeen. Two days later, Fleck became the youngest ever player to play in a senior British cup final, by appearing as a substitute in the 2008 Scottish Cup Final against Queen of the South. He gained his first start for Rangers against Falkirk on 17 January 2009, earning the man of the match award for his performance. Five days before this, The Times had placed Fleck seventh in their Top 50 Rising Stars of football list.

Fleck scored his first competitive goal in a 2–0 league victory over Dundee United at Ibrox on 31 January 2009. The goal was a 78th-minute penalty, awarded after Mihael Kovačević's challenge had brought Fleck to the ground. Fleck's talent, precocious performances, technique, vision and work-rate led him to be heralded as "Scotland's Wayne Rooney".

It was reported in August 2009 that Fleck had been dropped from the Rangers first-team after a training ground "bust-up" with the assistant manager, Ally McCoist. On 26 March 2010, Fleck signed a new three-year contract. That summer, he had a strong pre-season but then suffered a hamstring injury early in the campaign which hampered his progress.

With first team chances in short supply at Rangers, Fleck agreed to move to Sheffield United on a season-long loan at the end of the 2011 summer transfer window but the deal subsequently fell through as the paperwork was not completed before the deadline. In January 2012, having appeared to have seized a fresh chance in the team at Rangers a few weeks earlier, Fleck signed for Championship club Blackpool on loan, despite renewed interest from Sheffield United.

In June 2012, Fleck lodged an objection against his contract being transferred to the newco set up by Charles Green. PFA Scotland had previously commented that players were entitled to become free agents if they objected to the transfer.

Coventry City
On 4 July 2012, Fleck joined League One club Coventry City after he rejected his Rangers contract being transferred to the new company. Rangers were reported to have a sell-on agreement, meaning they would be entitled to a percentage of any transfer fee Coventry subsequently received for the player. Fleck scored his first Coventry goal in a 4–1 loss away to Shrewsbury Town from the penalty spot on 18 September 2012. He struggled to nail down a starting spot in the team during his first season at the club, particularly during the reign of Mark Robins, although he went on to make 35 appearances and scored three times.

The arrival of Steven Pressley as Coventry City manager in March 2013 saw Fleck regain a starting spot in the Coventry City line-up, starting every game of the remaining 2012–13 season in a deep-lying central midfield role. Fleck remained first-choice for the following season which Coventry City played at Northampton Town's Sixfields Stadium and played a key role in the team as they overcame a 10-point deduction to mount an unlikely play-off push for the first half of the season.

Fleck struggled for form as the team's form collapsed in the remaining months of the 2013–14 season but started the following campaign well, putting in a strong performance as the team beat Gillingham 1–0 to mark the club's return to Coventry in September 2014. Although his form was up-and-down throughout much of a campaign where the Sky Blues struggled for consistency, Fleck signed an 18-month contract extension in January 2015 to keep him at the club until the summer of 2016. Between the start of the 2012–13 season and the end of the 2013–14 season, he scored just one goal for Coventry.

Fleck saw another upturn in form at Coventry City in the 2015–16 season where under the management of Tony Mowbray he was encouraged to play a more forward-thinking role in the team, aided by the defensive support of midfield partner Romain Vincelot. Fleck's importance to the team was described by Mowbray as being 'the oil in our machine' as the Sky Blues rose to the top of the League One table. Fleck was rewarded for his improvement in 2015–16 by being awarded the club's player of the year award by both the fans and his teammates at the club's end of season awards.

Sheffield United
Fleck signed a three-year contract with Sheffield United in July 2016. He scored his first goal for the club in a 4–1 win over Chesterfield on 13 November 2016. On 8 April 2017, Fleck scored a late winner against Northampton Town at Sixfields Stadium – the fans reacted by running onto the pitch to celebrate promotion. On 15 April 2017, United were crowned League One champions and promoted to the Championship. On 22 September 2017, Fleck signed a new four-year contract with the club to keep him at Bramall Lane until summer 2022.

Fleck has won the Player of the Year award twice whilst at Sheffield United, once in the 2016–17 season (tied with teammate Billy Sharp) and again the next year.

On 28 April 2019, Fleck saw his second promotion in three seasons with United, this time to the Premier League, the club returning after a 12-year absence.

On 22 February 2020, Fleck signed a new three-year deal.

International career
After playing for Scotland at under-21 level, Fleck was called up to the Scottish senior team for the first time in November 2018. He did not play in that match, and had to decline an invitation to join the squad in May 2019 as it clashed with his wedding in Ayrshire, arranged two years earlier when he seemed far less likely to be involved with the national team.

On 10 October 2019, Fleck gained his first senior Scotland cap in a 4–0 defeat to Russia in Moscow.

In May 2021, Fleck was named in the 26-man Scotland squad for the 2020 European Championships.   While on pre-tournament training camp, Fleck tested positive for Covid-19.

Career statistics

Club

International

Honours
Rangers
Scottish Premier League: 2008–09, 2009–10, 2010–11
Scottish Cup: 2007–08

Sheffield United
EFL League One: 2016–17

Individual
PFA Team of the Year: 2016–17 League One
Coventry City Player of the Year: 2015–16
Sheffield United Player of the Year: 2016–17, 2017–18

References

External links

1991 births
Living people
Footballers from Glasgow
Scottish footballers
Scotland youth international footballers
Scotland under-21 international footballers
Scotland international footballers
Association football midfielders
Rangers F.C. players
Blackpool F.C. players
Coventry City F.C. players
Sheffield United F.C. players
Scottish Premier League players
English Football League players
Premier League players
UEFA Euro 2020 players
People educated at Knightswood Secondary School